L. Caspar "Cap" Wister was an American football player and investment banker.  

He played college football at the end position for Princeton University.  He was a consensus first-team end on the 1906 All-America football team.  In a game against Villanova in 1906, Wister was on the receiving end of the first legal forward pass in Princeton history. He graduated from Princeton in 1908.

After graduating Princeton, Wister went into the investment banking business. His business career was interrupted by service as an infantry captain in World War I. He died in 1968 at age 80.

References

American football ends
All-American college football players
Princeton Tigers football players